Downtown Plano station is a DART Light Rail station in Plano, Texas. It opened on December 9, 2002.

It is located at the historic Plano Station, which was once served by the first-generation interurban Texas Electric Railway, and now serves as the Interurban Railway Museum.

External links
 DART - Downtown Plano Station

Dallas Area Rapid Transit light rail stations
Railway stations in the United States opened in 2002
2002 establishments in Texas
Railway stations in Collin County, Texas